Lola Melnyck (born 29 October 1982) is a Russian dancer, TV presenter, and model who made most of her career in Brazil, Chile, and Argentina.

Biography
Melnick was born to a Russian family in Odessa, Soviet Ukraine. Her father was a diplomat. When she was 14, the family moved to France, where she learned French and English. She eventually learned to speak Spanish and Portuguese as well.

Career
Early in her career, Melnick was a dancer in Argentina. In the late 2000s, she met Brazilian talk show host Jô Soares in Chile, who invited her for an interview, making her famous in Brazil. She was then hired by Rede Bandeirantes and worked as a reporter in the carnival program Band Folia. From 2011 on, she has worked for SBT as a talent judge, reporter, and interviewer. She was the cover of Issue 475 of Playboy Brazil, from December 2014.

References

External links

1982 births
Living people
Russian television presenters
Ukrainian television presenters
Brazilian television presenters
Russian female dancers
Ukrainian female dancers
Brazilian female dancers
Brazilian women television presenters
Russian women television presenters
Ukrainian women television presenters
Chilean television presenters
Chilean female dancers
Chilean women television presenters